Shyam Ramsay (17 May 1952 – 18 September 2019) was a Bollywood film director. He was one of the seven Ramsay Brothers who were active in Indian cinema throughout the 1970s and the 1980s. Shyam Ramsay was considered the main artist and head of this group. They produced a number of horror movies such as Bandh Darwaza, Purana Mandir, and Veerana.

Their popularity waned towards the end of the 1980s, as Ramsay started diverting his creative energy and focus on television programming which was in demand because of the multiple private channels such as Zee TV, Star Plus etc. that were launched in the early nineties in India. He started India's first horror TV series for Zee TV – Zee Horror Show. It was a huge hit and its popularity is proved by the various communities created in its memory on social networking communities like Facebook & Orkut by its fans.

After Zee Horror Show, he made a few episodes of Saturday Suspense, X Zone and Nagin for Zee TV. In 2008, he along with his daughter, Saasha Ramsay directed a supernatural series based on the concept of wishful female serpent for Sahara One, called Neeli Aankhen.

Shyam Ramsay came back to feature films from the year 2000 when he started the production of Dhund: The Fog which was released on 21 February 2003. Then he made Ghutan in 2007 and a comedy horror film, Bachao in 2010. His latest release Neighbours released in January, 2014.

Films directed

 Gentayangan (2018)
 Koi Hai (2017)
 Neighbours (2014 Indian Film)
 Bachaao - Inside Bhoot Hai... (2010)
 Ghutan (2007)
 Dhund: The Fog (2003)
 Talashi (2000)
 Nagin (1999) (TV series)
 Anhonee (1998) (TV series)
 The Zee Horror Show (1993–97) (TV series)
 Mahakaal (1993)
 Police Mathu Dada (1991)
 Inspector Dhanush (1991) 
 Ajooba Kudrat Ka (1991)
 Bandh Darwaza (1990)
 Purani Haveli (1989)
 Veerana (1988)
 Tahkhana (1986)
 Telephone (1985)
 Saamri (1985)
 Purana Mandir (1984)
 Ghungroo Ki Awaaz (1981)
 Hotel (1981)
 Sannata (1981)
 Dahshat (1981)
 Saboot (1980)
 Guest House (1980 film) (1980)
 Aur Kaun? (1979)
 Darwaza (1978)
 Andhera (1975)
 Do Gaz Zameen Ke Neeche (1972)
 Nakuli Shaan (1971)

Films edited

 Veerana (1988)
 Khel Mohabbat Ka (1986) (as Shyam)
 Telephone (1985)
 Purana Mandir (1984)
 Ghungroo Ki Awaaz (1981)
 Dahshat (1981) (co-editor)
 Saboot (19 deep in the world is a great80) (co-editor)
 Guest House (1980) (co-editor)

Films written

 Inspector Dhanush (1991) (story) (as Tulsi-Shyam)
 Bandh Darwaza (1990) (screenplay)
 Veerana (1988) (screenplay)
 Buddha Mil Gaya (1971) (story) (as Shyam)

Films produced

 Ghutan (2007) (producer)
 Bandh Darwaza (1990) 
 Veerana (1988)
 Saamri 3D (1986) (producer)

References

External links

Film directors from Mumbai
1952 births
2019 deaths
20th-century Indian film directors
21st-century Indian film directors
Hindi-language film directors